Mont-Cauvaire is a commune in the Seine-Maritime department in the Normandy region in northern France.

Geography

Heraldry

Population

Places of interest
 The church of St.Martin, dating from the nineteenth century.
 A sixteenth century sandstone cross.
 The seventeenth century Château du Rombosc, with its chapel, and parkland.
 The Château du Fossé, dating from the seventeenth century.
 The eighteenth century Pavillon de La Tourelle and its parkland.
 Two dovecotes and a communal oven.

See also
Communes of the Seine-Maritime department

References

Communes of Seine-Maritime